Frederick John Gladman (1 February 1839 – 12 November 1884) was an Australian educationist and author whose work had an influence on the formation of Australia's educational system. His textbooks were used as late as the 1930s to train teachers.

Biography
Gladman was born on 1 February 1839 in London. He attended a monitorial school until he was fourteen.  Gladman then served an apprenticeship as a pupil-teacher at the British and Foreign School in Bushey, Hertfordshire. Later he received a year of teacher training from Borough Road Training College in London.

He had a successful career teaching at a small school in Surrey from 1859 until 1862. In 1863, at the young age of 24, he was given the position of headmaster of a larger school in Great Yarmouth.  In 1869 he entered the University of London, ultimately receiving two Bachelor's degrees.  Gladman then returned to Borough Road Training College to serve as a headmaster.

Gladman was employed by the British and Foreign School Society, and in his capacity of notable educator, became an Inspector of Schools in pre-federation Australia. He was an advocate for the Lancasterian System for the Education of the Poor.

School Work
Published posthumously in 1886, this textbook, which had two parts, was the de facto teaching resource in Australian Schools prior to world war 2.

JP Rogers was A High School Principal of the prestigious Sydney Boys High School for some thirty years. He had a personal copy of Gladman's School Work from his teacher education days.

The timetables published in School Work were in fold out sections. The small foldout was for small country schools, with populations below 150 students. The large fold out was for larger, city schools, which had a population averaging 1000.

Schooling in the 1880s was compulsory for all children from years one to years 7, or ages 5 to 14. Different colonies having different requirements.

Published works

 The Handy Book of English History (London, 1874), As co-editor with Rev. William Legge
School Method (London, 1877)
 School Work in 1886 part of his Jarrold's Pupil Teachers series.

References

 Australasian Schoolmaster files, 1875–85 (State Library of Victoria); Education Department, registered letters, 1876–85 (State Library of Victoria).
Melbourne University

1839 births
1884 deaths
Academic staff of the University of Melbourne
Alumni of the University of London